Aquaculture Research and Development Centre, Kajjansi (ARDC), is a national centre responsible for aquaculture research and development in Uganda. It is a branch of the National Fisheries Resources Institute (NAFIRRI).

The center undertakes the following studies:

 Fish Feeds
 Fish Health
 Genetics
Hatchery Productivity
 Mapping & Market
 MSI Nile Perch Project
 New species
 Ornamentals
 Production Systems.

The site attracts a number of bird species both Waterfowl species and land birds seen around the fish ponds and at the edges of the site. The centre undertakes research on 300 fish species that are extinct as well as the threatened ones like the riverine Ningu (Labeo victorianus), Kisinja (Barbus spp), Nkolongo (Synodontis spp) and Kasulu (Mormyrids).

Fish reared at the site 
Nile Tilapia
Nile perch.
Mirror carp
African catfish
lung fish
Kisinja

References

External links 
 "How aquaculture can save Uganda's lakes"
 "Uganda Promotes Aquaculture as Fish Stock in Lakes Dwindles "
 "China-Uganda Aquaculture Project Launched"
 "Uganda: Kajjansi Research Centre Renovated"

Research institutes in Uganda
Fish farming
Kumusha